Little Deaths is a 2011 British anthology horror film written and directed by Sean Hogan, Andrew Parkinson, and Simon Rumley. The film has three segments: House & Home, Mutant Tool, and Bitch. Each segment is directed by a different author and are unrelated to one another in any way other than sharing a theme of sex and death. Critical reviews for Little Deaths were polarized and the United Kingdom DVD release had to have some portions removed due to their sexually violent content.

Synopsis

House and Home
In Sean Hogan's segment, Richard (Luke de Lacey) and Victoria (Siubhan Harrison) are a married couple who try to alleviate their boredom by picking up homeless women under the guise of a Christian charity, with the intent to abuse them sexually. But when they pick up Sorrow, they soon discover that they have taken on more than they can handle, and that Sorrow is not exactly the woman she appears to be.

Mutant Tool
The second segment was directed by Andrew Parkinson and follows Jen (Jodie Jameson), a sex worker who visits Dr Reese (Brendan Gregory) in order to get help with her drug addiction. The doctor prescribes medication which gives Jen the ability to see frightening visions whenever she touches someone. In her visions, she sees a strange man being held prisoner, who wants to die. Jen does not realise that the doctor’s prescription incorporates the emissions of this mutant man, who is being held captive by the doctor.  Dr Reese has been feeding his prisoner human kidneys as part of a twisted post-Nazi experiment. Eventually Jen herself mutates, growing an enormous penis. She in turn becomes the doctor’s next captive, producing excessive emissions from her “mutant tool”.

Bitch
Simon Rumley's short focuses on the dysfunctional relationship between Pete (Tom Sawyer) and Claire (Kate Braithwaite). Claire routinely subjects Pete to emotional and physical abuse and, in the bedroom, makes him participate in various BDSM activities such as forcing him to live and behave as a dog while he gets pegged. It would appear that the reason behind Claire's abusive behavior towards Pete is that she is extremely cynophobic and takes out her anger on the dogs she fears by treating her boyfriend like a dog. Pete longs for his relationship with Claire to get better and for her to give him more respect and acceptance, but is pushed to his limit when Claire decides, in front of Pete, to sleep with his best friend Al (Tommy Carey).  Pete is devastated and plots his revenge; he destroys all the dog-like artifacts in the house, and then gradually acquires a whole pack of feral dogs, which he deliberately keeps hungry. At home with Claire, he persuades her to be handcuffed naked to their bed, on the pretext he wants to have anal sex with her. But instead he pours dog food on to her buttocks and then releases the entire pack of starving dogs into the bedroom. The film closes to a background of Claire’s agonised screams.

Development
Hogan began planning the film anthology after a prior film project did not come to fruition. He approached Parkinson and Rumley with the idea, as Hogan believed that the differences in their filmmaking styles would work well in an anthology setting. The three collaborated on the film as a whole in the pre-production stages, but "kind of went [their] separate ways" after production began.

Hogan has stated that he and Rumley initially had difficulty casting the roles for their segments House & Home and Bitch, as many actors declined to participate after reading the scripts.

Cast

House & Home
Luke de Lacey as Richard Gull
Holly Lucas as Sorrow
Siubhan Harrison as Victoria Gull
James Oliver Wheatley as Sorrow's Companion
Marc Bennett as Homeless
Jennifer Handorf as Homeless 
Nick Harwood as Homeless
Mike Hewitt as Homeless
James Hinson as Homeless
Eddie Hogan as Homeless
Kimberly Howson as Homeless
Paul Goodwin as Homeless
Andrew Parkinson as Homeless
Fiona Watt as Homeless
Danielle White as Homeless

Mutant Tool
Jodie Jameson as Jen
Daniel Brocklebank as Frank
Brendan Gregory as Dr. Reese 
Christopher Fairbank as X
Rob 'Sluggo' Boyce as Mutant
Mike Anfield as Michael
Scott Ainslie as Middle Aged John 
Steel Wallis as Drew
James Anniballi as Hoodie
Errol Clarke as Frank's Accomplice
Oliver Guy-Watkins as Dealer's Client

Bitch
Tom Sawyer as Pete
Kate Braithwaite as Claire
Tommy Carey as Al 
Amy-Joyce Hastings as Lucy

Reception
Critical reception has been mixed to positive. Shock Till You Drop and FEARnet both gave predominantly positive reviews, with Shock Till You Drop commenting that "as a whole, Little Deaths is ultimately one of the best horror anthologies I've ever seen, not the least of which because it ignores the pretense of a framing device in favor of ideas that bind its segments more tightly together than a wraparound story ever could".

References

External links

2011 films
British horror anthology films
British independent films
2011 horror films
Films about rape
BDSM in films
Horror anthologies
2011 independent films
2010s English-language films
2010s British films